The 53rd International 500 Mile Sweepstakes was an auto race held at the Indianapolis Motor Speedway in Speedway, Indiana on Friday, May 30, 1969. It was the third round of the 1969 USAC Championship Car season. Polesitter A. J. Foyt led the race in the early stages, looking to become the first four-time winner of the 500. Near the halfway point, however, a lengthy pit stop to repair a broken manifold put him many laps down. Despite a hard-charging run towards the end, he wound up managing only an eighth-place finish, 19 laps down. Lloyd Ruby, a driver with a hard-luck reputation at the Speedway, was leading the race just after the midpoint. During a pit stop, he pulled away with the fueling hose still attached, ripped a hole in the fuel tank, and was out of the race.  The incident put Mario Andretti in the lead for rest of the way.

Mario Andretti led 116 laps total and won for car owner Andy Granatelli. With Andretti's finish time of 3:11:14.71, it was the fastest run Indianapolis 500 up to that date, breaking the previous record by nearly five minutes. Andretti's victory capped off an up-and-down month of May. He entered the month as a favorite, but he crashed his primary car, a radical four-wheel-drive Lotus, during practice. Andretti suffered burns but was able to qualify a back-up car in the middle of the front row. Mario Andretti's 1969 Indy 500 win is the lone victory at the race for the storied Andretti racing family. As of 2022, no Andretti has won the Indianapolis 500 since. Likewise, it was a triumphant first victory for owner Granatelli, after a long presence at Indianapolis - and a long string of disappointments, first with Novis, and then with the Turbines.

While Foyt and Andretti qualified 1st-2nd, the most notable story from time trials was the plight of Leon Duray "Jigger" Sirois, whose pit crew inadvisedly waved off his qualifying run on pole day. It would go down in history as one of the most famous gaffes in Indy history.

After five drivers were killed at the Speedway in the decade of the 1960s, the month of May 1969 was relatively clean, with no major injuries. The only injuries for the month were during two practice crashes. Mario Andretti suffered burns to his face, and Sammy Sessions, who suffered a fractured knee cap. Al Unser actually suffered the most serious injury of the month, when he crashed his personal motorcycle in the infield. He suffered a broken leg the night before time trials was to begin, and had to sit out the race. Bud Tingelstad served as his replacement in the Vel's Parnelli Jones Racing entry.

The car in which Andretti won the 1969 Indy 500 is owned by the Smithsonian, while a replica made from the original blueprints sits on display at the Indianapolis Motor Speedway Museum.

Rule changes
For 1969, not a single front-engined car managed to qualify for the race, and ultimately, one would never do so again. All 33 cars in the field were rear-engined piston-powered machines. After the famous near-miss failures of the controversial STP Granatelli Turbine machines in 1967 and 1968, USAC imposed additional restrictions that effectively rendered them uncompetitive. The annulus inlet was further reduced from 15.999 in² to 11.999 in², and the Granatelli team abandoned the project. USAC stopped short of an outright ban on turbine cars, and it was not last time one would be entered. However, a turbine car would never manage to qualify for the race again.

By 1969, USAC had slowly begun to relax the rules regarding wings. While bolt-on wings were still not allowed, similar devices such as airfoils and spoilers were permitted, as long as they were an integral part of the bodywork. Several cars arrived at the track with a myriad of aerodynamic devices.

Goodyear arrived at the track in 1969 with a new, low-profile, wider tire.

Race schedule
The 1969 race was the most recent Indy 500 scheduled for a Friday; the Uniform Monday Holiday Act was implemented in 1971 and Memorial Day became a three-day holiday weekend (Saturday–Monday) annually. Only one other subsequent year (1973) would the race be scheduled for a weekday. In 1970–1972, the race was scheduled for a Saturday, and beginning in 1974, the race has been scheduled for a Sunday.

Practice and time trials
The track opened on May 1 to light activity for the first few days. By Tuesday May 6, activity had picked up, and the top drivers were lapping in the 165 mph range. On Wednesday May 7, A. J. Foyt turned a lap of 169.237 mph, establishing himself as the top driver during the first week of practice.

During the second week of practice, Mario Andretti took over the speed chart. On Monday May 12, he ran a lap of 170.197 mph, then followed it up on Wednesday May 14 with a lap of 171.657 mph. Al Unser was close behind with a lap of 169.141 mph.

On Thursday May 15, A. J. Foyt joined the "170 mph" club with a lap of 170.875 mph. By the end of the week, three drivers were over 170. Roger McCluskey posed a 170.283 mph on Friday May 16, the day before time trials was scheduled to begin. Through two weeks, though, no drivers had topped Joe Leonard's track record of 171.959 mph set in 1968.

Saturday May 17 – Jigger Sirois
Pole day was scheduled for Saturday May 17 from 11 a.m. to 6 p.m. However, rain threatened to wash out the afternoon. At the time, the qualifying rules were a bit unclear and they did not necessarily provide extensions or provisions in case of a rain delay or a rain stoppage during the pole position round. Only cars that made an attempt before the rains came (and before the track was scheduled to close at 6 o'clock) might be eligible for the pole position. Rookie Leon Duray "Jigger" Sirois drew the #1 spot in the qualifying order.

At 4:12 p.m., the track was dry and finally opened for qualifying. Sirois took to the track for his first (of three allotted) qualifying attempt. He completed his first three laps at:
Lap 1 – 161.783 mph
Lap 2 – 162.279 mph
Lap 3 – 160.542 mph

However, on his fourth and final lap, his pit crew - seemingly dissatisfied with the run thus far - displayed the yellow flag and waved off the run, and it was aborted. Arnie Knepper was the second car in line, and pulled away for his warm up laps. Rain began to fall again before Knepper even saw the green flag. The track closed for the day.

That evening, Al Unser Sr., who had won the season opener at Phoenix, took to the infield to pass the time during the rain delay. He climbed on his motorcycle, and started riding around. In a small jump over a ditch, he toppled and the kickstand came down and pierced his left leg. He suffered a compound fracture to his left tibia, and was taken to the hospital. Unser was put in a cast, and was sidelined for a month and a half.

Sunday May 18
Rain washed out time trials for the second day in a row. It was the first time in modern history that the entire first weekend of time trials was lost due to rain. Pole day was rescheduled for Saturday May 24.

At 1:04 p.m., a few cars make it out on the track for practice, but that lasted for only 18 minutes. Heavy rain and a tornado watch in the area closed the track for the day.

It was quickly noticed by media and fans that had Jigger Sirois' crew not waved off his final lap on Saturday, he would have been the lone qualifier of the weekend and sat on the coveted provisional pole position for at least an entire week.

Saturday May 24
After 23 days of waiting, and two rainouts, the field was finally ready to begin time trials. On Wednesday May 21, pole favorite Mario Andretti suffered a serious crash in turn four during a practice run. He suffered burns to his face, but no other serious injuries. His four-wheel drive Lotus machine was destroyed, and Andretti would have to qualify a back-up car.

A. J. Foyt won the pole position with a speed of 170.568 mph. A total of 25 cars completed runs. After his practice crash, Mario Andretti qualified the Brawner-Hawk for the middle of row one. Due to his facial burns, Mario asked his twin brother Aldo to stand in for him during the traditional front row photo session.

The news of Foyt winning the pole was relayed to the astronauts on Apollo 10.

Sunday May 25
The field was filled to 33 cars with two cars bumped. For the first time in modern history, the field lined up coincidentally by speed from top-to-bottom.

On the second weekend of time trials, Jigger Sirois waved off his second attempt, and also waved off his third and final attempt when his speed was not fast enough. As it ended up, Sirois's first attempt on May 17 would have been fast enough to qualify for the race and possibly, depending on interpretation of the rules, the pole position. Sirois never managed to qualify at Indy in subsequent years, and became a source of popular folklore.

Starting grid
(W) = Former Indianapolis 500 winner; (R) = Indianapolis 500 rookie

Alternates
First alternate: Rick Muther  (#26)

Failed to qualify

George Benson  (#89)
Chuck Booth  (#51)
Scott Carr  – Withdrew during rookie orientation
Max Dudley  (#61)
Cy Fairchild  (#51)
Charlie Glotzbach  (#52)
Jerry Grant (#17, #69, #78, #96)
Bobby Grim (#16, #71, #89, #94)
Bob Harkey (#14) – No refresher test
Graham Hill (#70) – Withdrew
Jim Hurtubise (#56)
Dee Jones  (#37, #51)
Al Miller (#51, #71, #72, #75, #96)
Lothar Motschenbacher 
Pat O'Reilly  (#51) – Driver declined, no license
Johnny Parsons 
Sam Posey  (#94)
Jochen Rindt (#80) – Withdrew, injured
Les Scott  (#34, #50, #89)
Jigger Sirois  (#14)
Dave Strickland  (#34)
Al Unser (#3, #15) – Withdrew, injured
Bob Veith (#79, #90)
Roger West  (#75)
Denny Zimmerman  (#67, #68)

Race recap

Start
On the grid, LeeRoy Yarbrough's car failed to start, and the field pulled away, leaving him behind. On the pace lap, Yarbrough was able to get his car cranked, and frantically charged to catch up to the pack. He jockeyed to find his rightful starting position in row three, but managed only to make it mid-pack as the field took the green flag. Going into turn one, Mario Andretti took the lead from the middle of the front row, with polesitter A. J. Foyt following in second. Bruce Walkup, meanwhile, was out on the first lap with a transmission failure.

First half
Andretti led the first five laps, then Foyt took the lead going into turn one. One of the weaknesses of the turbocharged Fords used by Andretti (and several other top drivers) was overheating. So Andretti eased slightly and Foyt took over. Foyt would lead for 66 laps in the first half. The early stages of the race saw heavy attrition and a series of unscheduled pit stops. Several cars were out before lap 30, including Art Pollard, Ronnie Bucknum, Johnny Rutherford, and Jim McElreath, who had a fire as the car went down into turn one. McElreath was able to stop the car in turn 1 and got out uninjured, bringing out the first of only two yellow light periods. Retiring to the pits early was Gordon Johncock and Bobby Unser, as well as Jack Brabham, whose Repco engine would eventually suffer ignition failure.

The second of two yellow light periods came out on 87 when Arnie Knepper broke a suspension piece, causing him to crash in turn 4. He hit the outside wall and came to rest near the entrance to the pit area. Wally Dallenbach spun under the yellow and dropped out with a bad clutch.

On lap 99, A. J. Foyt headed to the pits with a split manifold. He spent over twenty minutes in the pits as the team made repairs. However, he did return to the race. With the Foyt team scrambling to diagnose A.J.'s troubles, the team neglected to signal George Snider to the pits, and Snider ran out of fuel on the track. Snider was eventually pushed back to the pits and rejoined the race, but he lost a considerable number of laps.

In the first half, Andy Granatelli's three-car effort was down to one as both Art Pollard and Carl Williams were out early. Mario Andretti was the only Granatelli car still running. After years of disappointment, including the frustrations of the turbines the past two years, Andretti was still in position to finally give Granatelli his first 500 victory.

Second half
After leading ten laps up to that point, Lloyd Ruby went into the pits on lap 105. As the team was refueling the car, Ruby started to pull away too soon, with the hose still attached. A large hole was ruptured in the side of the fuel tank, and all the fuel spilled out onto the pavement. Ruby was out of the race, leaving Mario Andretti alone in front.

On lap 150, Joe Leonard was black-flagged for leaking fluid. He made a long pit stop to replace a punctured radiator, returned to the race, and managed a 6th-place finish. A. J. Foyt, after returning from repairs, was now among the fastest cars on the track. His hard charging second half saw him finish in 8th place.

Mario Andretti dominated the second half, and won comfortably over second place Dan Gurney. But Andretti's race was not without incident. On one occasion, he nearly hit the wall in turn two. On his final pit stop, he knocked over chief mechanic Clint Brawner, and nearly stalled the engine as he was pushed away. His transmission fluid was low, the clutch was reportedly slipping, and despite an extra radiator added by Brawner behind the driver's seat after qualifying, engine temperature was running high. Despite the complications, Andretti maintained over a full-lap lead late in the race and cruised to victory.

Car owner Andy Granatelli, who abandoned the turbine cars after the heartbreaks of 1967 and 1968, planted a famous kiss on Andretti's cheek in victory lane. There were no yellow lights during the second half, and the final 110 laps were run under green. Andretti ran the whole race without changing tires.

In victory lane an emotional happy Mario stated:

"I wanted to win this race so bad that you can't believe it. I will be having to pinch myself for the rest of the night. I am happy for Andy and STP. This is my biggest win and it's awesome."

Box score
The top four racers were allowed to complete the entire 500 mile race distance. Eight additional cars were running as of the race finish, but were flagged off the track not having completed the entire distance. Andretti's race completion time of 3:11:14.71 was the fastest ever as of 1969.

Race statistics

Broadcasting

Radio
The race was carried live on the IMS Radio Network. Sid Collins served as chief announcer and Len Sutton served as "driver expert." At the conclusion of the race, Lou Palmer reported from victory lane. The broadcast came on-air with a 30-minute pre-race.

The broadcast was carried on over 950 affiliates, including AFN, shortwave to troops in Vietnam, and the CBC. Foreign language translations were made in French, Italian, Spanish, and Portuguese. The broadcast was also carried in Mexico City on XEVIB. The broadcast reached an estimated 100 million listeners.

Among the many visitors to the booth were O. J. Simpson, Oscar Robertson, Earl McCullouch, Irv Fried (Langhorne), Wally Parks, Dale Drake, Sam Hanks, and Duke Nalon. For the second year in a row, Senator Birch Bayh visited the booth, along with his teenage son, future senator Evan Bayh. Later in the race, Senator Vance Hartke also visited, accompanied by Secretary of Transportation John A. Volpe.

Television
The race was carried in the United States on ABC's Wide World of Sports. The broadcast aired on Saturday, June 7. Jim McKay anchored the broadcast with Rodger Ward as analyst and Chris Economaki as pit reporter.

The telecast featured a summary of time trials as well as pre-race interviews. During the race, McKay and Economaki served as roving pit reporters, and their interviews were edited into the final production.

The broadcast has re-aired on ESPN Classic starting in May 2011.

For the fifth year, a live telecast of the race was shown in theaters on a closed-circuit basis; once more, Charlie Brockman called the action.

Gallery

Notes

References

Works cited
1969 Indianapolis 500 Press Information - Daily Trackside Summary
Indianapolis 500 History: Race & All-Time Stats - Official Site
1969 Indianapolis 500 Radio Broadcast, Indianapolis Motor Speedway Radio Network

Indianapolis 500 races
Indianapolis 500
1969 in American motorsport
Indianapolis 500
May 1969 sports events in the United States